Ryan Joseph Ramos Rizada, better known as R.J. Rizada, (born October 5, 1982 in Davao) is a Filipino former professional basketball player who played in the Philippine Basketball Association. He was the twelfth overall pick in the 2006 PBA Draft. He played for the Ateneo de Davao Blue Knights for a year and was recruited by the Far Eastern University Tamaraws after he was scouted in the University games.

References

1982 births
Living people
Basketball players from Davao City
Philippines men's national basketball team players
Filipino men's basketball players
Shooting guards
FEU Tamaraws basketball players
Powerade Tigers players
San Miguel Beermen players
Ateneo de Davao University alumni
ASEAN Basketball League players
Powerade Tigers draft picks